Brandon Firla is a Canadian actor and comedian best known for his role as Clark Claxton on the television sitcom Billable Hours. In season four of Little Mosque on the Prairie in late-September 2009, he began a role as the new Anglican priest in town, Reverend Thorne. He also played Jonathan Sidwell, an investment banker, in Suits.

Filmography

Film

Television

References

External links
 

Year of birth missing (living people)
Living people
Canadian male television actors
Canadian male film actors